Birdman is the debut major studio album by American rapper Baby, who would later be known as Birdman. It was released on November 26, 2002, by Cash Money Records. On January 15, 2003, the album was certified gold by the Recording Industry Association of America (RIAA), for the shipments of 500,000 copies in the United States.

Track listing 
Credits adapted from Tidal and liner notes.

Notes
 signifies a co-producer

Sample credits
 "Never Had Nothin'" contains replayed elements from "Rock Box", written by Darryl McDaniels, Joseph Simmons, and Larry Smith.
 "Baby You Can Do It" contains replayed elements from "Take Your Time (Do It Right)", written by Harold Clayton and Sigidi Abdullah.

Charts

Weekly charts

Year-end charts

Certifications

References

2002 debut albums
Birdman (rapper) albums
Cash Money Records albums
Albums produced by the Neptunes
Albums produced by Timbaland
Albums produced by Bryan-Michael Cox
Albums produced by Jermaine Dupri
Albums produced by Swizz Beatz
Albums produced by Jazze Pha
Albums produced by Mannie Fresh
Gangsta rap albums by American artists